St. Mochta's F.C. is an Irish association football club based in Clonsilla, Dublin. Their senior team play in the Leinster Senior League Senior Division. They also regularly compete in the FAI Cup, the FAI Intermediate Cup, the FAI Junior Cup and the Leinster Senior Cup.

History
St. Mochta's were founded in September 1949 when founder Barth O'Brien put a motion to the AGM of the St. Mochta's Branch of the Catholic Young Men's Society (CYMS) that a football section be formed within the branch. At the time, it was unsure exactly what type of football the club would play, considering that it could mean association football, rugby football, or gaelic football. After a vote from aspiring members, association football or soccer was chosen.

In its early years, the club played its football at Somerton on the same grounds where Castleknock GAA club now play and briefly in Coolmine Lane, close to Coolmine railway station before permanently establishing themselves at Porterstown. In the early 1960s the CYMS became defunct but the club carried on as St. Mochta's.

Later years
In 2017 the club won the Leinster Senior League Senior Division for the first time. In October 2018, the Football Association of Ireland announced that St. Mochta's would be receiving €20,000 in funds to help fund a full-sized astroturf pitch at the club's Porterstown Road facility. In July 2019, the club celebrated its 70th anniversary with a glamour friendly tie against English League One side Bristol Rovers. Hailed as 'the biggest club the .... side have ever played', the match ended in a 7-0 loss for St. Mochta's.

Notable former players

Republic of Ireland internationals

  Glen Crowe
  Mark Kennedy

Republic of Ireland u21 internationals

  Stephen Paisley

Others
  Philip Hughes
  Dean Kelly

Honours
Leinster Senior League Senior Division (1): Winners 2016-17

References

Leinster Senior League (association football) clubs
Association football clubs in Dublin (city)
1949 establishments in Ireland
Association football clubs established in 1949
Former Athletic Union League (Dublin) clubs